The 2020 Rally de Portugal (also known as the Vodafone Rally de Portugal 2020) was a motor racing event for rally cars that was scheduled to be held over four days between 21 and 24 May 2020, but was cancelled due to the COVID-19 pandemic. It was set to mark the fifty-fourth running of Rally de Portugal and planned to be the fifth round of the 2020 World Rally Championship, World Rally Championship-2 and World Rally Championship-3.

Ott Tänak and Martin Järveoja were the defending rally winners. Toyota Gazoo Racing WRT, the team they drove for in 2019, were the defending manufacturers' winners. Kalle Rovanperä and Jonne Halttunen were the defending winners in the World Rally Championship-2 category, but they would not defend their titles as they were promoted to the higher class. In the World Rally Championship-3 category, Pierre-Louis Loubet and Vincent Landais were the reigning rally winners.

Background

Route

Itinerary
All dates and times were WEST (UTC+1).

Notes

References

External links
  
 2020 Rally de Portugal at ewrc-results.com
 The official website of the World Rally Championship

2020 in Portuguese motorsport
Portugal
2020
Portugal